The 1984 NCAA Division I men's lacrosse tournament was the 14th annual Division I NCAA Men's Lacrosse Championship tournament, involving twelve NCAA Division I college men's lacrosse teams.

Overview
The championship game was hosted by University of Delaware and was played in front of 17,253 fans at Delaware Stadium. The game saw Johns Hopkins University defeat previously unbeaten Syracuse University by the score of 13–10. This was the third finals where two undefeated champions met for the title and the last time this has occurred.

The Bluejays snapped Syracuse's 22-game winning streak holding the Orange top offensive guns Brad Kotz and Tim Nelson in check. Hopkins caught a break early in the finals when Tim Nelson was injured by his own teammate, in the second quarter, and did not play for the remainder of the game. Hopkins scored the first six goals of the contest.

Hopkins was led by goaltender Larry Quinn, attackman Brian Wood with three goals and senior attackman Peter Scott with two goals and three assists. Hopkins compiled a perfect 14 and 0 mark, and won its fifth NCAA title under the direction of first-year head coach Don Zimmerman. The Blue Jays returned to the NCAA Championship game for the eighth straight season. This would turn out to be the last undefeated season for Johns Hopkins until 2005.

This game is notable for several outstanding saves from goaltender Larry Quinn who was named the tournament outstanding player. Quinn made one of the most famous stops in NCAA lacrosse history, with Hopkins holding an 11-9 lead in the 4th quarter of the finals and Syracuse gaining momentum. On a fast break, Quinn dove across the goal to save a point blank shot by Tom Nelson. Inspired, Hopkins took control of the game from that point.

Peter Scott, considered one of the best lacrosse players to come out of the Pennsylvania school system, finished his career with four straight NCAA final appearances, made three All-American teams and is currently among the top Johns Hopkins Career Points leaders.

Bracket 

(i) one overtime

Box Scores

Tournament Finals

Tournament Semi-finals

Tournament Quarterfinals

Outstanding players
Larry Quinn, Johns Hopkins (Named Tournament's Most Outstanding Player)

Notes 

 North Carolina’s 11-2 victory over Virginia is the lowest score in tournament history.

See also
1984 NCAA Women's Lacrosse Championship
1984 NCAA Division III Lacrosse Championship

References

External links
1984 NCAA Lacrosse Title Syracuse Hopkins on YouTube

NCAA Division I Men's Lacrosse Championship
NCAA Division I Men's Lacrosse Championship
NCAA Division I Men's Lacrosse Championship
NCAA Division I Men's Lacrosse Championship
NCAA Division I Men's Lacrosse Championship
NCAA Division I Men's Lacrosse Championship